Richard Beadon  (15 April 1737 – 21 April 1824) was Master of Jesus College, Cambridge 1781–1789 and later Vice-Chancellor of the University, Bishop of Gloucester and Bishop of Bath and Wells.

Life
Beadon was born at Pinkworthy in Devon, son of the Rev. Robert Beadon, Rector of Oakford. He was educated at Blundell's School and admitted to St John's College, Cambridge in 1754. He was eighth Wrangler and Senior Chancellor's Medallist in 1758.

He married Rachel, granddaughter of Bishop Gooch, of Ely, and had one son, Richard. He was also the uncle of Frederick Beadon.

It is said he was admirable both as Master and Vice-Chancellor, and a very handsome man. His portrait survives in the College.

Career
Fellow and Tutor of St. John's 
Archdeacon of London, 1775–1789 
Master of Jesus College, 1781–1789 
Tutor to Prince Frederick William, afterwards Duke of Gloucester 
Bishop of Gloucester, 1789–1802
Bishop of Bath and Wells, 1802–1824

References 

 List of Masters, Jesus College website, Extracted April 24, 2009

1737 births
1824 deaths
People educated at Blundell's School
Alumni of St John's College, Cambridge
Archdeacons of London
Masters of Jesus College, Cambridge
Bishops of Gloucester
Bishops of Bath and Wells
Cambridge University Orators
Vice-Chancellors of the University of Cambridge
Fellows of St John's College, Cambridge
18th-century Church of England bishops